Common District or Common Historic District may refer to:
Barre Common District, Barre, MA, listed on the NRHP in Massachusetts
Billerica Town Common District, Billerica, MA, listed on the NRHP in Massachusetts
Meetinghouse Common District, Lynnfield, MA, listed on the NRHP in Massachusetts
 Common Historic District (Reading, Massachusetts), listed on the NRHP in Massachusetts
Topsfield Town Common District, Topsfield, MA, listed on the NRHP in Massachusetts
Uxbridge Common District, Uxbridge, MA, listed on the NRHP in Massachusetts
 Common District (Wakefield, Massachusetts), listed on the NRHP in Massachusetts

or any of many other historic districts with town-specific names of form Town Common Historic District listed on the NRHP, such as Willington Common Historic District, in Willington, Connecticut